Best Actor Award (Vietnamese: Giải nam diễn viên xuất sắc nhất) is one of the awards presented at the Vietnam Film Festival to recognize an actor for the performance which has been determined the best by the juries in the feature film and direct-to-video categories.

History 
The category was awarded for the first time in the 2nd Vietnam Film Festival (1973) for Huy Công, he also holds the record in this category with two awards. Lê Công Tuấn Anh was also awarded two but one of them is for the role in a direct-to-video feature film.

The achievement in a direct-to-video feature film, which was first awarded in the 9th Vietnam Film Festival (1990), is no longer awarded since the 20th Vietnam Film Festival (2017). It is because this category has been removed.

Awards

Notes 
At the 10th Vietnam Film Festival, there was an acting award given to the children cast of the children feature film Cát bụi hè đường.

References 

Vietnam Film Festival
Film awards for lead actor